Commandant Charcot Glacier Tongue is a broad glacier tongue about  long extending seaward from Commandant Charcot Glacier. It was charted by the French Antarctic Expedition, 1950–52, and named by them for the French polar ship Commandant Charcot.

References 

Ice tongues of Antarctica
Bodies of ice of Adélie Land